Meet James Mossman is an Australian television series which aired from 1957 to 1958 on Sydney station ATN-7. It debuted 6 October 1957, and was a talk show. It aired in a 15-minute time-slot at 4:45PM on Sundays. At the time, most Australian series aired in a single city only.

References

External links

1957 Australian television series debuts
1958 Australian television series endings
Black-and-white Australian television shows
English-language television shows
Australian television talk shows